Transforming growth factor beta regulator 4 (TBRG4), also known as cell cycle progression restoration protein 2 (CPR2) and FAST kinase domain-containing protein 4 (FASTKD4), is a protein that in humans is encoded by the TBRG4 gene on chromosome 7. This protein is part of the FASTKD family, which is known for regulating the energy balance of mitochondria under stress and cell cycle progression. TBRG4 is involved in cell proliferation in hematopoiesis and multiple myeloma.

Structure 

TBRG4 shares structural characteristics of the FASTKD family, including an N-terminal mitochondrial targeting domain and three C-terminal domains: two FAST kinase-like domains (FAST_1 and FAST_2) and a RNA-binding domain (RAP). The mitochondrial  targeting domain directs TBRG4 to be imported into the mitochondria. Though the functions of the C-terminal domains are unknown, RAP possibly binds RNA during trans-splicing. TBRG4 also contains multiple putative leucine zipper domains.

Function 

As a member of the FASTKD family, TBRG4 localizes to the mitochondria to modulate their energy balance, especially under conditions of stress. Though ubiquitously expressed in all tissues, TBRG4 appears more abundantly in skeletal muscle, heart muscle, and other tissues enriched in mitochondria. TBRG4 also localizes to the bone marrow (BM), where it functions in hematopoiesis by inducing IL-6 and VEGF secretion, which then stimulate cell proliferation and angiogenesis. However, it inhibits immunoglobulin secretions by normal B cells.

Clinical significance 

The involvement of TBRG4 in hematopoiesis links it to multiple myeloma (MM), which stems from malignant proliferation of plasma cells in the bone marrow. High expression of TBRG4 has been linked to enhanced cell proliferation and poorer outcome; thus, downregulation of its expression may contribute to reducing tumor growth by arresting cell cycle progression.

References

Further reading